Cont Mdladla Mhlanga (1957/1958 – 1 August 2022) was a Zimbabwean playwright, actor, and theatre director. He was also the founder and head of the Amakhosi Theatre Productions company, formed in 1982.

Mhlanga was a critic of the government of Robert Mugabe, and was arrested often for public expressions of his views. He, alongside Burmese satirist Zarganar and City of Rhyme – a 14-strong hip-hop group from northern Brazil, whose lyrics condemn violence – were winners of the inaugural Freedom to Create Prize in 2008.

Works

Written
 The Good President
 The End
 Vikela
 Sinjalo
 Children On Fire
 Games and Bombs
 The Members

Directed
 Bamqgibela Ephila
 Omunye Umngcwabo

References

External links
 AmaKhosi
 Voices from Zimbabwe

1950s births
2022 deaths
Year of birth missing
Zimbabwean male film actors
Zimbabwean dramatists and playwrights
20th-century Zimbabwean male actors
Northern Ndebele people